A planetary flyby is the act of sending a space probe past a planet or a dwarf planet close enough to record scientific data. This is a subset of the overall concept of a flyby in spaceflight.

The first flyby of another planet with a functioning spacecraft took place on December 14, 1962, when Mariner 2 zoomed by the planet Venus.

Planetary flybys are commonly used as gravity assist maneuvers to "slingshot" a space probe toward its primary target without expending fuel, but in some cases (such as with New Horizons), flybys are the primary objectives of a mission in of themselves.

A relatively recent example of a flyby spacecraft is New Horizons, which performed flyby maneuvers of Jupiter, Pluto and its moons in the 21st century. The flyby of Jupiter, used as a gravity assist, allowed the craft to reach Pluto at high velocity without the complications of slowing down, after which it proceeded further into the Kuiper Belt on an escape trajectory out of the Solar System.

List of planetary flybys

Gallery

See also 
 Mariner program
 Mars program
 Pioneer program
 Vega program
 Venera
 Voyager program
 Zond program
 List of Earth flybys
 Mars flyby
 Timeline of the Space Race
 Timeline of Solar System exploration

Notes

References 

Spaceflight